The Battle of Mieszko I with Wichmann and Wolinians was the decisive last battle of Polish–Veletian War, fought on 21 or 22 September 967, between Duchy of Poland led by Mieszko I, with aid of the Duchy of Bohemia against the Confederacy of the Veleti led by Wichmann the Younger, with aid of Wolinians. The exact location of the battle remains unknown, though, some historians assume that it happened near Santok. The battle had ended with decisive Polish victory, leading to the end of the war. Veleti and Wolinians had received devastatingly heavy casualties, while the self-proclaimed leader of the army, Wichmann the Younger had died shortly after battle.

Before the battle  
In 967, the corps of Veletian, and, allied with them, Wolinian forces, had again attacked Poland, going from the north, from the island of Wolin, and heading to the south, alongside the Oder river. The forces of Veleti and Wolinains had consisted together of around 5 to 6 thousand soldiers. Self-proclaimed leader of Vieleti, Wichmann the Younger, had commanded a division of cavalry. Forces under command of Mieszko I had around 4,000 Polish troops and 2 divisions of Bohemian cavalry, that could count between 100 and 300 troops.

With the help of the Prissani tribe that live in Poland, Mieszko I had traveled with his forces to the area near Szczecin and Wolin. Using scattered reconnaissance units, he had lured enemy forces near Santok, waiting for a convenient moment to attack. On 20 September, both sides set up the camps. The battle was fought on 21 or 22 September. The exact location of the battle remains unknown, though, some historians assume that it happened near Santok.

The battle 
In the morning, Veleti had noticed Polish forces, set in the defensive formation. However, they were not aware of Polish armoured companions and Bohemian cavalry, hidden on both sides of the field between both armies, setting a trap. Believing, that they had outnumbered Polish forces, Veleti and Wolinians had left their fortified camp and formed offensive formations, made out of a few rows of troops, after what, they had charged frontally onto Polish forces. During the first phase of the battle, Polish forces had backed up under the attack of enemy forces. It could be an intentional move ordered by Mieszko I, to lure Veletians deeper into his trap. As the battle progressed, Polish forces continued moving back, in order to lure enemy forces further into the trap. Eventually, the cavalry hidden on the sides had attacked Veleti, surrounding them, and cutting their way to their camp. At the same time, Polish troops had stopped retreating and begun the frontal attack. Surrounded, Veletian troops had started losing, receiving devastatingly high casualties. The battle ended with a decisive Polish victory.

After the battle 
Wichmann, together with a small group of soldiers, had managed to escape the battlefield, and was found and captured by Polish forces, in the morning of the next day. There are two versions of what happened to him next. According to one version, he got surrounded by Polish troops, following which he had surrendered himself to them, however, despite a previous agreement with Polish knights, he got killed by Polish soldiers in the fight. According to the second version, he had died from the injuries he had acquired in the battle. After his death, Mieszko, had given Wichmann's sword and armor to Otto I, the Holy Roman Emperor and the cousin of Wichmann. With the end of the battle, the war had ended. Poland had established the hegemony in the Farther Pomerania, gaining control over the region, including the island of Wolin.

References

Bibliography 
 Tadeusz M. Nowak, Historia Oręża Polskiego 963–1795.
 Paweł Rochala, Cedynia 972, Bellona, Warsaw. 2002.
 Robert F. Barkowski, Bitwy Słowian, Bellona, Warsaw. 2018.
 Józef Dobosz. Monarchia i możni wobec Kościoła w Polsce do początku XIII wieku. Poznań. Wydawnictwo Poznańskie. 2002. ISBN 83-7177-110-X.

Mieszko I, Wichmann, Wolinians, battle of
Mieszko I, Wichmann, Wolinians, battle of
Mieszko I, Wichmann, Wolinians, battle of
History of Pomerania
History of Poland during the Piast dynasty
Conflicts in 967
10th century in Poland